Blankenhain is a village in Crimmitschau, district of Zwickau, Saxony. The Blankenhain Castle is located in the village.

References

Former municipalities in Saxony
Crimmitschau